John Tremelling (28 July 1929 – 15 June 2016) was an Australian sports shooter. He competed in the 50 metre pistol event at the 1960 Summer Olympics.

References

External links
 

1929 births
2016 deaths
Australian male sport shooters
Olympic shooters of Australia
Shooters at the 1960 Summer Olympics
Sportsmen from South Australia
People from Mount Gambier, South Australia
Commonwealth Games medallists in shooting
Commonwealth Games gold medallists for Australia
Shooters at the 1982 Commonwealth Games
20th-century Australian people
Medallists at the 1982 Commonwealth Games